The Republic of Singapore and the Republic of South Africa are independent countries which have achieved independence from Great Britain and currently maintain friendly bilateral relations. The connections between the two countries are based primarily on their membership in the Commonwealth of Nations, and their interactions in international trade and tourism. Both countries also cooperate in social and economic development issues.

Singapore has a High Commission in Pretoria while South Africa has a High Commission in Singapore.

History 

On August 9, 1965, Singapore was expelled from Malaysia and became an independent state. However, due to the apartheid policy, it did not establish diplomatic relations with South Africa until 1993, when the two countries signed agreements to do so. In 1994, South Africa rejoined the Commonwealth, resulting in the Embassies of both countries being renamed High Commissions and the Ambassadors becoming High Commissioners.

On 5 March 1997, Nelson Mandela became the first President of South Africa to visit Singapore, where he met President Ong Teng Cheong and Senior Minister Lee Kuan Yew. In 2007, S.R. Nathan became the first President of Singapore to visit South Africa.

In January 2013, International Enterprise Singapore set up a centre in Johannesburg, its first overseas centre in Sub-Saharan Africa.

Trade relations 

In 2011, the total trade value between Singapore and South Africa was worth S$2.54 billion (or R16 billion). In 2012, the export value from Singapore to South Africa was worth US$1.31 billion, and the export value from South Africa to Singapore was worth US$950 million.

Singaporean exports were mainly communication equipment, electrical machines, office and data machines, manufactured articles, general industrial machines, plastics, crude rubber, textiles, coffee, and spices to South Africa.

During the same period, South Africa exported mainly organic chemicals, petroleum and its products, iron and steel, non-ferrous metals, metal manufactures, vegetables, inorganic chemicals, metallic ores, and scraps and paper manufactures to Singapore.

In 2011, the direct investment value from Singapore to South Africa was worth S$491 million (or R3.23 billion), while the direct investment value from South Africa to Singapore was worth S$19.04 million (or R125 million).

Singapore Airlines operates a flight between Singapore Changi Airport and Cape Town International Airport in South Africa, via O.R. Tambo International Airport in Johannesburg. During the 1990s, South African Airways had also operated direct flights to Singapore. It later established a codeshare with Singapore Airlines on daily flights between Singapore and Johannesburg.

See also 

 Foreign relations of Singapore
 Foreign relations of South Africa

References

External links 

 High Commission of Singapore in South Africa
 High Commission of South Africa in Singapore

 
Singapore
South Africa
Singapore and the Commonwealth of Nations
South Africa and the Commonwealth of Nations